Alexeyevsky District is the name of several administrative and municipal districts in Russia. The districts' name generally derives from or is related to the male first name Alexey.

Districts of the federal subjects

Alexeyevsky District, Belgorod Oblast, an administrative and municipal district of Belgorod Oblast
Alexeyevsky District, Moscow, a district in North-Eastern Administrative Okrug of Moscow
Alexeyevsky District, Samara Oblast, an administrative and municipal district of Samara Oblast
Alexeyevsky District, Republic of Tatarstan, an administrative and municipal district of the Republic of Tatarstan
Alexeyevsky District, Volgograd Oblast, an administrative and municipal district of Volgograd Oblast

Renamed districts
Alexeyevsky District, name of Tattinsky District of the Sakha Republic in 1930–1990

See also
Alexeyevsky (disambiguation)

References